Memory-scraping malware or RAM Scrapping malware is a malware that scans the memory of digital devices, notably point-of-sale (POS) systems, to collect sensitive personal information, such as credit card numbers and personal identification numbers (PIN) for the purpose of exploitation.

Operation
The magnetic stripe of payment cards hold three different data tracksTrack 1, Track 2 and Track 3.
The POS RAM scrapers were created to implement the use of expression matches to gain access and collect the Track 1 and Track 2 card data from the RAM process memory. Some RAM scrapers use the Luhn algorithm to check the validity of card data before exfiltration.

See also
 Point-of-sale malware

References

Malware
Theft